Uniküla is a village in Valga Parish, Valga County in Estonia.

Poet Friedrich Kuhlbars (1843–1924) was born in Uniküla.

References

Villages in Valga County
Kreis Dorpat